The Dimock Community Health Center Complex is a historic medical complex at 41 and 55 Dimock Street in Boston, Massachusetts.

The center's Zakrzewska Building was built in the Stick style of architecture in 1872, designed by Charles Amos Cummings and Willard T. Sears as the New England Hospital for Women and Children.  This facility was the first in New England and the second in the United States to be run by female doctors. Contemporary renovations were completed by James A. Fox and it was added to the National Register of Historic Places in 1985.  In 1991 the complex was declared a National Historic Landmark (as "New England Hospital for Women and Children"; the National Register listing is for "Dimock Community Health Center Complex").

The Dimock Center is affiliated with Beth Israel Deaconess Medical Center.  It focuses on three core program areas: Healthcare, Behavioral Health Services and Youth & Family Services. From the center's historic nine-acre campus located in the Egleston Square section of Roxbury, MA, and several satellite locations, The Dimock Center provides access to high-quality healthcare and human services that include: Adult & Pediatric Primary Care, Women's Healthcare, Eye and Dental Care, HIV/AIDS Specialty Care, Outpatient Mental Health services, Residential Programs, The Mary Eliza Mahoney House shelter for families, pre-school, Head Start programs, after-school programs and Adult Basic Education & Workforce Training programs.  The Dimock Center has been recognized nationally as a model for the delivery of integrated care in an urban community.

See also
List of National Historic Landmarks in Boston
National Register of Historic Places listings in southern Boston, Massachusetts

References

External links

Dimock Center web site

Hospital buildings completed in 1872
Cummings and Sears buildings
Hospital buildings on the National Register of Historic Places in Massachusetts
Hospitals in Boston
National Historic Landmarks in Massachusetts
Buildings and structures in Boston
Roxbury, Boston
National Register of Historic Places in Boston